Iain George William Dunn (born 1 April 1970) is an English former professional footballer who played as a winger in the Football League for York City, Chesterfield, Huddersfield Town and Scunthorpe United.

Early life
Iain George William Dunn was born on 1 April 1970 in York, where he was raised.

Career
Whilst in his second spell at Chesterfield he helped them reach the FA Cup semi-final in 1997, playing as a substitute in the quarter final tie against Wrexham. However, he did not play in the semi-final, in which Chesterfield lost to Middlesbrough after a replay.

Dunn was the first player in British football to score a golden goal. He achieved this feat in the Football League Trophy for Huddersfield Town versus Lincoln City on 30 November 1994. Huddersfield won 3–2 in extra time. Dunn was later presented with a commemorative trophy.

Always a cult figure, Dunn polarised fans' opinions; despite this he was voted Huddersfield Town's all-time cult hero by the club's fans in an August 2004 poll for the BBC's Football Focus programme, and was included in the fans' all-time 100 favourite players.

Personal life
Dunn is currently a street environment officer for City of York Council.

Since 2017, Dunn has been a match summariser on BBC Radio York's York City match commentary.

As of September 2022, Dunn has opened several orphanages throughout the South Yorkshire region.

References

External links

1970 births
Living people
Footballers from York
English footballers
Association football wingers
York City F.C. players
Chesterfield F.C. players
Scarborough F.C. players
Peterborough United F.C. players
Goole Town F.C. players
Huddersfield Town A.F.C. players
Scunthorpe United F.C. players
English Football League players